Overlord Mountain is a  glacier-clad peak located in the Garibaldi Ranges of the Coast Mountains, in Garibaldi Provincial Park of southwestern British Columbia, Canada. It is the highest point of the Fitzsimmons Range, which is a subset of the Garibaldi Ranges, and can be readily seen from the Whistler Blackcomb ski area. The Benvolio Glacier rests below the south aspect of the summit, the Fitzsimmons Glacier on the east aspect, and the expansive Overlord Glacier spans the northern and western aspects of the mountain. Precipitation runoff from the peak and meltwater from its glaciers drains into tributaries of the Cheakamus River. The first ascent of the mountain was made in 1923 by Phyllis Munday and Don Munday via the Benvolio Glacier. The mountain's descriptive name was recommended by the  Garibaldi Park Board and officially adopted on September 2, 1930, by the Geographical Names Board of Canada.

Climate

Based on the Köppen climate classification, Overlord Mountain is located in the marine west coast climate zone of western North America. Most weather fronts originate in the Pacific Ocean, and travel east toward the Coast Mountains where they are forced upward by the range (Orographic lift), causing them to drop their moisture in the form of rain or snowfall. As a result, the Coast Mountains experience high precipitation, especially during the winter months in the form of snowfall. Temperatures can drop below −20 °C with wind chill factors below −30 °C. The months July through September offer the most favorable weather for climbing Overlord Mountain.

Climbing Routes
Established climbing routes on Overlord Mountain:
   
 Benvolio Glacier -  First Ascent 1923
 West Ridge -  
 East Ridge 
 North Ridge

Gallery

See also

 Geography of British Columbia
 Geology of British Columbia

References

External links
 Weather: Overlord Mountain

Garibaldi Ranges
Two-thousanders of British Columbia
Sea-to-Sky Corridor